Southern Suburbs is the name of:

Southern Suburbs F.C., South African association football team
Southern Suburbs SC, Australian association football team
Southern Suburbs, Cape Town, location in South Africa
Southern Suburbs Tatler, newspaper